Piney River is a stream in the U.S. state of Tennessee. It is a tributary to the Beech River.

Piney River was named for the pine timber along its course.

References

Rivers of Henderson County, Tennessee
Rivers of Tennessee